Pedro III Nsimba Ntamba was a ruler of the Kingdom of Kongo during its tumultuous civil war period.

King Pedro III was the elder brother of King Joāo II and one of many partisans of the House of Kinlaza. Since 1666, the two royal kandas or lineages of Kinlaza and Kimpanzu had been fighting bitterly over the kingdom of Kongo.

First rule
In 1669, Pedro III became king of Kongo. The Kongo Civil War had been well underway, and the House of Kinlaza had chosen Pedro as its candidate. Like many rules during this period, his was a short one lasting only until June 1669. He was forced out of Kongo by the rival Kimpanzu faction and fled to Lemba where he ruled in opposition.

Sack of Sāo Salvador
In 1678, Pedro III returned to the capital of Kongo, Sāo Salvador, with an army. The capital was then held by the Kimpanzu king Daniel I. In the ensuing battle, Pedro III killed Daniel I and destroyed the city in the process. Afterwards, all claimants for the throne would reside in opposing mountain fortress namely Lemba, Kibangu and Mbamba Luvota.

Assassination
In 1680, King Pedro III was still ruling Lemba where he claimed the Kongo throne in opposition to the House of Kimpanzu partisans residing in Soyo's southern province of Luvota. Manuel de Nóbrega, brother of the slain King Daniel, swore vengeance and orchestrated a plot to kill Pedro III. Under the auspice of a truce, treacherously negotiated by the Prince of Soyo, Pedro III was lured into a trap expecting to make peace through marriage to a Kimpanzu noble. Instead, Manuel emerged from the Soyo wedding train dressed as a bride and shot Pedro III to death before escaping. The particular episode in Kongo's history would become one of the sticking points keeping the nobility from finding lasting peace.

See also
 List of Manikongos of Kongo

References

Manikongo of Kongo
1680 deaths
17th-century African people
Year of birth unknown